Muston may refer to:

Placenames
Muston, Leicestershire, England
Muston, North Yorkshire, England
Muston, South Australia, a locality on Kangaroo Island

People
Muston (surname)